Infanta Eulalia, Duchess of Galliera (María Eulalia Francisca de Asís Margarita Roberta Isabel Francisca de Paula Cristina María de la Piedad; 12 February 1864 – 8 March 1958), was the youngest and last surviving child of Queen Isabella II of Spain and Francisco, Duke of Cádiz, and the youngest sister of King Alfonso XII. She authored memoirs that were controversial for their critical perspective and allegations about the political policies of various Spanish and foreign governments.

Early life
Eulalia was born on 12 February 1864 in the Royal Palace of Madrid, the youngest of the five children born to Isabella II during her marriage to Francis de Assisi de Borbón, Duke of Cadiz, who survived to adulthood. She was baptised on 14 February 1864 with the names María Eulalia Francisca de Asís Margarita Roberta Isabel Francisca de Paula Cristina María de la Piedad. Her godparents were Robert I, Duke of Parma, and his sister Princess Margherita.

In 1868, Eulalia and her family were forced to leave Spain in the wake of the revolution.  They lived in Paris, where Eulalia was educated.  She received her first communion in Rome from Pope Pius IX.

In 1874, Eulalia's brother Alfonso was restored to the throne in place of their mother Queen Isabella II.  Three years later, Eulalia returned to Spain. She lived at first in El Escorial with her mother, but later moved to the Alcázar of Seville and then to Madrid.

Marriage and children
On 6 March 1886, at Madrid, Eulalia married her first cousin Infante Antonio de Orléans y Borbón, Duke di Galliera, son of Antoine, Duke of Montpensier, and his wife, Infanta Luisa Fernanda of Spain. The officiant was Cardinal Zeferino González y Díaz Tuñón, Archbishop of Seville. The wedding was delayed several months on account of the death of Eulalia's brother, King Alfonso XII. Eulalia and Antonio spent their honeymoon at the Palacio Real de Aranjuez.

Eulalia and Antonio had two sons:

 Infante Alfonso, Duke of Galliera (1886–1975)
 Luis Fernando de Orleans y Borbón (1888–1945)

After the birth of her younger son, Eulalia lived apart from her husband. She maintained residences in Spain and Paris and visited England frequently.

Visit to the United States
In May 1893 Eulalia visited the United States; her controversial visit to the World's Columbian Exposition in Chicago was particularly well-documented. She traveled first to Puerto Rico, then to Havana, Cuba, and arrived in New York on the 18 of May on the Spanish cruiser Infanta Isabel, before making her way to Washington, D.C., where she was received by President Grover Cleveland at the White House.  She then proceeded to New York City. Eulalia was later admitted to membership in the Daughters of the American Revolution as a descendant of King Charles III of Spain.

Publications
Eulalia was the author of several works that were controversial within royal circles, although she never ceased to have frequent contact with her relatives both in Spain and elsewhere.

In 1912, under the pseudonym Comtesse de Avila, Eulalia wrote Au fil de la vie (Paris: Société française d'Imprimerie et de Librarie, 1911), translated into English as The Thread of Life (New York: Duffield, 1912).  The book expressed Eulalia's thoughts about education, the independence of women, the equality of classes, socialism, religion, marriage, prejudices, and traditions. Her nephew King Alfonso XIII telegraphed her to demand that she suspend the book's publication until he had seen it and received his permission to publish it. Eulalia refused to comply.

In May 1915, Eulalia wrote an article about the German Emperor William II for The Strand Magazine. The following month she published Court Life from Within (London: Cassell, 1915; reprinted New York: Dodd, Mead, 1915).

In August 1925, Eulalia wrote Courts and Countries After The War (London: Hutchinson, 1925; reprinted New York: Dodd, Mead, 1925). In this work she commented on the world political situation and articulated her belief that there could never be peace between France and Germany. She also made a celebrated observation about Benito Mussolini's Italy by reporting that she crossed the Italian frontier and heard the phrase "Il treno arriva all'orario" [the train is arriving on time], a boast often cited in connection with the Fascist regime at the time.

In 1935, Eulalia published her memoirs in French, the Mémoires de S.A.R. l'Infante Eulalie, 1868–1931 (Paris: Plon, 1935). In July 1936, they were published in English as Memoirs of a Spanish Princess, H.R.H. the Infanta Eulalia (London: Hutchinson, 1936; reprinted New York: W.W. Norton, 1937).

Death
On 9 February 1958, Eulalia had a heart attack at her home in Irun. She died there on 8 March and is buried in the Pantheon of the Princes in El Escorial. She was the last surviving grandchild of Ferdinand VII of Spain.

Honours

  Spanish Royal Family: Knight Grand Cross of the Order of Charles III
  Spanish Royal Family: 620th Dame Grand Cross of the Order of Queen Maria Luisa

Ancestry

Notes

Bibliography
 García Luapre, Pilar. Eulalia de Borbón, Infanta de España: lo que no dijo en sus memorias. Madrid: Compañía Literaria, 1995. .

1864 births
1958 deaths
House of Bourbon (Spain)
Spanish infantas
Princesses of France (Orléans)
Duchesses of Galliera
Burials in the Pantheon of Infantes at El Escorial
Collars of the Order of Isabella the Catholic
Knights Grand Cross of the Order of Isabella the Catholic
Daughters of monarchs
Spanish women memoirists